Parmena meregallii is a species of beetle in the family Cerambycidae. It was described by Sama in 1984. It is known from France and Spain.

References

Parmenini
Beetles described in 1984